Roseto is a borough in Northampton County, Pennsylvania. The population of Roseto was 1,567 at the 2010 census. Roseto is part of the Lehigh Valley metropolitan area, which has a population of 861,899 and is the 68th most populated metropolitan area in the U.S. as of the 2020 census.

Roseto is known in the fields of sociology and cardiology for the Roseto effect, wherein the close-knit Italian American community exhibited half the national average rate of heart disease in the mid-20th century.  This finding helped to establish that stress can contribute to heart disease.

History
Roseto, meaning "Rose garden" in Italian, is named for the village of Roseto Valfortore. Neighboring communities were settled primarily by those of German, English, and Welsh descent. The first Italian immigrants from Roseto Valfortore, Italy arrived in 1882 to work in the local slate quarries. The Wind Gap and Delaware Railroad opened a line through the town in 1883. It was operated by the Central Railroad of New Jersey until 1905, after which it was merged into the Lehigh and New England Railroad, which abandoned the line in 1955. Roseto was incorporated as a borough in 1912.

Geography
Roseto is located at  (40.880576, -75.217345).

Transportation

Pennsylvania Route 191 and Pennsylvania Route 512 are the numbered highways serving Roseto. PA 191 follows Roseto Avenue and First Street along a north-south alignment through the eastern part of the bourough. PA 512 follows Blue Valley Drive along an east-west alignment along the southwestern edge of the borough.

Demographics

As of the census of 2000, there were 1,653 people, 640 households, and 476 families residing in the borough. The population density was 2,634.5 people per square mile (1,013.1/km2). There were 670 housing units at an average density of 1,067.8 per square mile (410.6/km2). The racial makeup of the borough was 98.85% White, 0.36% Asian, 0.18% African American, 0.18% from other races, and 0.42% from two or more races. Hispanic or Latino of any race were 1.94% of the population.

There were 640 households, out of which 33.6% had children under the age of 18 living with them, 57.3% were married couples living together, 11.7% had a female householder with no husband present, and 25.6% were non-families. 22.2% of all households were made up of individuals, and 11.4% had someone living alone who was 65 years of age or older. The average household size was 2.58 and the average family size was 3.04.

In the borough, the population was spread out, with 25.2% under the age of 18, 7.1% from 18 to 24, 28.9% from 25 to 44, 19.2% from 45 to 64, and 19.5% who were 65 years of age or older. The median age was 38 years. For every 100 females there were 89.3 males. For every 100 females age 18 and over, there were 87.3 males. The median income for a household in the borough was $39,813, and the median income for a family was $45,833. Males had a median income of $36,563 versus $21,750 for females. The per capita income for the borough was $17,419. About 5.7% of families and 7.2% of the population were below the poverty line, including 9.4% of those under age 18 and 8.7% of those age 65 or over.

Site of academic studies
Roseto and its inhabitants were the scene of a study by folklorist Carla Bianco in the early 1970s. She compared Roseto, Pennsylvania to the mountain town where its name and most of its original settlers had come from, Roseto Valfortore in the Apulia region of southern Italy. Bianco calculated that "95 percent of its present 1,600 inhabitants are still descendants of Roseto Valfortore". A local doctor also noticed positive health rates in Roseto, leading to a study that identified the Roseto effect in public health.

Public education
Roseto is served by Bangor Area School District. Students in grades nine through 12 attend Bangor Area High School in Bangor. Faith Christian School is also located in the borough.

References

External links

Boroughs in Northampton County, Pennsylvania
Boroughs in Pennsylvania
Italian-American culture in Pennsylvania
Little Italys in the United States
Populated places established in 1883